Abida occidentalis is a species of land snail in the family Chondrinidae.

Geographic distribution
Abida occidentalis is found in France on northern slopes of the Pyrenees, as well as in a few locations in Andorra and Catalonia.

Ecology
The species can be found living on limestone.

References

Chondrinidae
Gastropods of Europe
Gastropods described in 1888